Blepharophimosis-ptosis-esotropia-syndactyly-short stature syndrome is a very rare genetic and congenital disorder which is characterized by blepharophimosis, ptosis, V-esotropia, foot syndactyly, extra-ocular and frontal muscles weakness, low height/short stature, prognathism, and synophrys.

Only six cases from three consanguineous families across the world have been reported in medical literature. This disorder follows an autosomal recessive inheritance pattern.

Less commonly, anosmia, moderate intellectual disability, hypertelorism, and increased thickness of lower lips and eyebrows can also appear as symptoms of the syndrome

References 

Diseases and disorders